Alexis Skyy McFarland  is an American reality television personality. She is best known from being on Vh1’s tv show Love & Hip Hop: Hollywood, Love & Hip Hop: New York and Love & Hip Hop: Atlanta. Skyy has received media attention for her relationship with rapper Fetty Wap.

Early life
Skyy was born in Long Island City, New York City to Dominican and Jamaican parents. She grew up in Wyandanch New York. For a large part of her childhood, her father was absent from her life, and she was raised by her mother and grandmother alongside her brothers. At the age of 18, Skyy met her biological father. She was kidnapped and forced into human trafficking at age 15.

Career
In July 2017, Skyy joined the cast of Love & Hip Hop: Hollywood to co-star with Ray J, Keyshia Cole, and Teairra Mari.

Personal life
Skyy had a two-year relationship with Fetty Wap, which ended in 2016. Their sex tape was leaked after they broke up. She has one child who suffers from hydrocephalus.

References

External links 

 

People from Long Island
Living people
Participants in American reality television series
21st-century African-American people
21st-century African-American women
OnlyFans creators
Year of birth missing (living people)